Bob Shaw is an American art director and production designer. He was nominated for an Academy Award in the category Best Production Design for the film The Irishman. Shaw also won three Primetime Emmy Awards and was nominated for three more in the category Outstanding Art Direction for his work on the television programs The Sopranos, Mad Men and Boardwalk Empire.

Selected filmography 
 The Irishman (2019; co-nominated with Regina Graves)

References

External links 

Living people
Place of birth missing (living people)
Year of birth missing (living people)
American art directors
American production designers
Primetime Emmy Award winners